Meironiškiai (formerly) is a village in Kėdainiai district municipality, in Kaunas County, in central Lithuania. According to the 2011 census, the village had a population of 269 people. There are a shop, a community house, a medicine station, a farm in Meironiškiai. Two big stones standing in the village are declared as a nature heritage object.

History
Meironiškiai developed into a bigger settlement during the Soviet era, as it was a kolkhoz center.

Demography

Images

References

Villages in Kaunas County
Kėdainiai District Municipality